KXPD-LP, UHF analog channel 52, was a low-powered television station licensed to Eola, Oregon, United States. The station covered the Willamette Valley from Salem to Wilsonville, within the Portland, Oregon television market.

History
The station signed on the air on May 20, 2005 as the main signal of KWVT-LP, a local, English-language independent station owned by Northwest Television. (The station has since relocated to channel 17.)

On May 8, 2007, Northwest Television sold the broadcast license of KWVT-LP, to Churchill Media of Eugene, Oregon. Programming from Azteca América began August 17, 2007. The call letters were soon after changed to KXPD-LP.

In November 2007, the station was being carried by Comcast on digital channel 317 & 617 in the digital basic tier.

On December 30, 2009, KXPD-LP went off the air citing "substantial decreases in its revenue flow" over the past three years. In its application to the FCC for special temporary authority to remain silent, the station's license holder claimed that "losses have reached the point that the station no longer generates sufficient funds to pay operating expenses" and that the company was seeking to either sell the station or refinance and return to operation. However, the station never returned to air, and its license was soon cancelled by the FCC.

References

Television channels and stations established in 2005
Television channels and stations disestablished in 2009
Television stations in Oregon
2005 establishments in Oregon
2009 disestablishments in Oregon
XPD-LP